I Love the Blues, She Heard My Cry is the seventh studio album by American keyboardist George Duke. It was released in 1975 through MPS Records. Recording sessions for the album took place at Paramount Recording Studios in Hollywood, California. The album features contributions from frequent collaborators Leon "Ndugu" Chancler on drums, Airto Moreira and Flora Purim with guest appearances by trombonist Bruce Fowler, bassist Tom Fowler, percussionists Ruth Underwood and Emil Richards, guitarists Lee Ritenhour, Daryl Stuermer, Johnny "Guitar" Watson and others musicians. This album is dedicated to the memory of the late Julian "Cannonball" Adderley.

Duke used ARP and Moog synthesizers, Rhodes electric piano, Hohner clavinet and Mutron Phasers. For "Look into Her Eyes" and "That's What She Said", Brazilian musician Aitro Moreira played bongo drums, tambourine, berimbau, horse bell, gourd cabasa and other percussion instruments.

In the United States, the album peaked at number 169 on the Billboard 200 and at number 36 on the Top R&B/Hip-Hop Albums chart.

Track listing

Personnel 
 George Duke – synthesizer, Mutron Phasers, Rhodes electric piano, clavinet, vocals (tracks: 1, 2, 6, 7, 9, 10), producer
 Flora Purim – vocals (track 2)
 John Watson – vocals & guitar (track 10)
 Lee Ritenour – guitar (tracks: 1, 6)
 George Johnson – guitar (tracks: 2, 7, 8)
 Daryl Stuermer – guitar (track 4)
 Byron Lee Miller – bass (tracks: 2–4, 7), guitar (track 4)
 Tom Fowler – bass (tracks: 1, 6)
 Leon "Ndugu" Chancler – drums (tracks: 1–4, 6-9), gong (track 8), backing vocals (track 10)
 Airto Moreira – percussion (tracks: 2, 4)
 Emil Richards – marimba (track 4), percussion (track 5)
 Ruth Underwood – marimba & gong (track 8)
 John Wittenberg – violin (tracks: 4, 8)
 Bruce Fowler – trombone (track 8)
 Janet Ferguson Hoff – backing vocals (track 6)
 Pat Norris – backing vocals (track 10)
 Debra Fay – backing vocals (track 10)
 Chris Norris – backing vocals (track 10)
 Donna Correa – backing vocals (track 10)
 Larry Robinson – backing vocals (track 10)
 Roger Dollarhide – backing vocals (track 10)
 Kerry McNabb – recording
 Baldhard G. Falk – artwork, photography, executive producer

Chart history

References

External links 
 
 George Duke's 1970s discography on his website
 I Love the Blues, She Heard My Cry by George Duke on iTunes

1975 albums
George Duke albums
MPS Records albums
Albums produced by George Duke